Juan Castilla may refer to:

 Juan de Castilla y Haro (died 1326), Spanish nobleman
 Juan de Castilla (1460–1520), Spanish prelate
 Juan Carlos Castilla (marine biologist) (born 1940), Chilean marine biologist
 Juan José Castilla (born 1945), Mexican heptathlete
 Juan Carlos Castilla (footballer) (born 1978), Spanish football goalkeeper
 Juan Castilla (footballer) (born 2004), Colombian football midfielder

See also
 Juan Castillo (disambiguation)